Debra S. Dadey (born May 18, 1959) is an American writer and co-writer of 162 books, including 74 total Bailey School Kids books co-written with Marcia Jones. These comprise 51 in the Adventures of the Bailey School Kids series, 9 Bailey School Kids Jr. Chapter Books, and 14  Bailey School Kids - Special Editions.

Dadey was born in Morganfield, Kentucky. She was a first grade teacher and librarian before becoming a full-time writer. Her award-winning "books for reluctant readers" have been published by Scholastic, Tor/Starscape Publishing, Hyperion, Bloomsbury USA, Delacorte, Walker, Willowisp, and F&W Publishing.

Selected works

Nonfiction
 Story Sparkers: A creativity guide for children's writers, Dadey and Marcia Jones (Cincinnati, OH: Writer's Digest Books, 2000)

Fiction
Dadey as sole writer 
 Buffalo Bill and the Pony Express, illustrated by Charlie Shaw (Disney Press, 1994) – historical novel 
 Marty the Maniac, illus. Mel Crawford (1996) – first? of a Marty series (1996–?), some illus. by Meredith Johnson
 My Mom the Frog, illus. Richard A. Williams (Scholastic Corporation, 1996)
 Bobby and the Great, Green Booger, illus. Mike Gordon (St. Petersburg, FL: Willowisp Press, 1997) – first in a Bobby series
 Shooting Star: Annie Oakley the legend, illus. Scott Goto (NY: Walker and Co., 1997)
 Will Rogers: larger than life, illus. Scott Goto (1999)
 King of the Kooties, illus. Kevin O'Malley (Walker, 1999)
 Cherokee Sister (Delacorte Press, 2000) – historical novel
 The Swamp Monster in Third Grade, illus. Margeaux Lucas (Scholastic, 2002) – first in a Swamp Monster series
 Whistler's Hollow (1st US ed., NY: Bloomsbury Children's Books, 2002) – historical novel
 Great Green Gator Graduation, illus. Margeaux Lucas (Scholastic, 2006) 
 The Worst Name in Third Grade, illus. Tamara Petrosino (Scholastic, 2007) – first in a series 
 A Whale of a Tale, illus. Tatevik Avakyan (Aladdin Books, 2012) – Trident Academy series, aka Mermaid Tales 

Dadey with co-writers

 The Adventures of the Bailey School Kids, series (Scholastic, 1990–2009) written by Dadey and Marcia Jones, illustrated by John Steven Gurney
 Ghostville Elementary, series (Scholastic, 2003–2007), wri. Dadey and Jones, illus. Guy Francis
 The Keyholders, series (Tor Books Starscape, 2009) wri. Dadey and Jones, illus. Adam Stower
 Slime Wars, Dadey and her son Nathan Dadey, illus. Bill Basso (2003)
 Slime Time, Dadey and Nathan Dadey, illus. Bill Basso (2004)
 Triplet Trouble and the Runaway Reindeer, by Dadey and Jones, illus. John Speirs (1995) – first of a Triple Trouble series (1995–?)

Notes

References

Other sources
 Dadey biography at Scholastic Teachers – with  transcript of 1997 interview by Scholastic students
 Dadey at KidsReads

External links

 
 
 

1959 births
Living people
American children's writers